Geranium pyrenaicum, otherwise known as hedgerow cranesbill or mountain cranesbill is a perennial species of plant in the family Geraniaceae. 
It can be found on roadside verges and along hedgerows.

Distribution
It is probably introduced in England and Wales, where it is fairly common. Elsewhere, it can be found in the southern Alps, the Pyrenees and the Caucasus.

References

pyrenaicum
Taxa named by Nicolaas Laurens Burman